Harry Fritz may refer to:

 Harry Fritz (baseball) (1890–1974), third baseman in Major League Baseball
 Harry Fritz (coach) (1920–1987), collegiate athletics administrator and an American football, basketball, and baseball coach
 Harry Fritz (tennis) (born 1951), Canadian-American tennis player